Judge Washington may refer to:

Bushrod Washington (1762–1829), associate justice of the Supreme Court of the United States
Eric T. Washington (born 1953), associate judge of the District of Columbia Court of Appeals
George Thomas Washington (1908–1971), judge of the United States Court of Appeals for the District of Columbia Circuit